The dead cat strategy, also known as deadcatting, is the political strategy of deliberately making a shocking announcement to divert media attention away from problems or failures in other areas. The present name for the strategy has been associated with British former prime minister Boris Johnson's political strategist Lynton Crosby.

Origin
While he was mayor of London, Boris Johnson wrote a column for the 3 March 2013 edition of The Telegraph in which he described the "dead cat" as a piece of Australian political strategy about what to do in a situation in which the argument is being lost and "the facts are overwhelmingly against you".

Johnson employed the Australian Lynton Crosby as his campaign manager during the 2008 and 2012 London mayoral elections, leading to press speculation that he was the "Australian friend" in the story.

Use

Some observe that the strategy is used not only to distract when an argument is being lost but also to avoid responsibility or the repercussions of misconduct. Academics claim that continued use of the dead cat strategy is unsustainable, because the repeated staging of outlandish 'newsworthy pseudo-events' cannot go unnoticed over time, even if it has been used to win previous elections.

See also

References 

Propaganda techniques
Political campaign techniques
Rhetoric
Legal terminology from popular culture
Metaphors referring to cats